Procter & Gamble (P&G) is an American multinational consumer goods corporation with a portfolio of brands.

Brands with net sales of more than US$1 billion annually
As of 2015, the company stated it owned the following brands with net annual sales of more than $1 billion:

 Always menstrual hygiene products
 Ariel laundry detergent
 Bounty paper towels, sold in the United States and Canada
 Charmin bathroom tissue and moist towelettes
 Crest toothpaste
 Dawn dishwashing
 Downy fabric softener and dryer sheets
 Fairy washing up liquid 
 Febreze odor eliminator
 Gain laundry detergents, liquid fabric softener, dryer sheets and dish washing liquid
 Gillette razors, shaving soap, shaving cream, body wash, shampoo, deodorant and anti-perspirant
 Head & Shoulders shampoo
 Olay personal and beauty products
 Oral-B oral hygiene products
 Pampers & Pampers Kandoo and Luvs disposable diapers and moist towelettes.  The 2014 Financial Report lists Pampers as Procter & Gamble's largest brand.
 Pantene haircare products
 SK-II beauty products
 Tide laundry detergents and products
 Vicks cough and cold products

Brands by product type

Dishwashing
Dawn dishwashing liquid
Fairy washing-up liquid
Joy dishwashing liquid (outside the United States)
Gain dishwashing liquid
Ivory dishwashing liquid
Cascade dishwasher detergent

Menstrual hygiene
Always pads and menstrual hygiene products
Tampax tampons
Whisper menstrual hygiene products

Haircare

Ascend hair care products
Aussie haircare (shampoos/conditioners/styling aids)
Braun hair care and grooming products
Frederic Fekkai hair care products sold
Head & Shoulders shampoo
Herbal Essences hair care products (formerly part of Clairol)
Nicky Clarke hair products
Pantene hair care products (purchased from Hoffmann-La Roche in 1985)
Vidal Sassoon haircare products (purchased in 1984 from Vidal Sassoon)

Healthcare products
Align probiotics
Crest toothpaste
Femibion (acquired from Merck Group)
Fixodent denture adhesive
Iliac/Nasivin (acquired from Merck Group)
Metamucil laxative/fiber supplement (acquired G. D. Searle & Company in 1985)
Neurobion (acquired from Merck Group)
New Chapter dietary supplements
Oral-B toothbrushes and other oral hygiene products
Pepto-Bismol over-the-counter drug for minor digestive system upset (acquired as part of Norwich Eaton Pharmaceuticals in 1982)
Prilosec OTC (licensed from AstraZeneca)
Sangobion (acquired from Merck Group)
Scope mouthwash
Seven Seas (acquired from Merck Group)
Vicks cough and cold products

Household
 9 Elements cleaning products 
Ace stain remover liquid
Bounce fabric-softener sheet for dryers
Fairy (known as Dreft in the Netherlands and Yes in Sweden and Norway) dishwashing liquid, toilet soap, household soap, laundry detergent and dishwasher detergent
Febreze odor control
Flash cleaning products
Jar dishwashing liquid and dishwasher detergent
Mif (Russian: Миф) dishwashing liquid and dishwasher detergent
Mr. Clean household cleaners
Pampers disposable diapers
Puffs tissues
Luvs disposable diapers

Safeguard antibacterial soap
Swiffer cleaning products
 Microban cleaning products

Laundry detergents
Ariel laundry detergent
Bold laundry detergent
Bonux laundry detergent
Cheer laundry detergent
Daz detergent
Downy fabric softener
Dreft laundry detergent
Era laundry detergent
Fairy Non-Bio laundry detergent
Gain laundry detergent
Ola laundry soap 
PMC laundry soap 
Tide laundry detergent
Lenor fabric softener and cleaning products
Mif (Russian: Миф) laundry detergent

Skin care
Fresco bar soap 
Ivory bar
Old Spice aftershave, skin care and hair care products 
Secret antiperspirants and deodorants

Divested brands
Brands owned by Procter & Gamble in the past, but since divested:

Actonel (pharmaceutical division was spun off into Warner Chilcott in 2009)
Aleve, naproxen sodium (NSAID) drug, acquired by Bayer in 1997
Asacol
Attends line of incontinence and sanitary products. Sold to PaperPak in 1999.
Biz originally an enzyme-based laundry pre-soak, later a detergent booster, then an all-fabric bleach, sold to Redox Brands in 2000
Camay lightly scented bath soap, sold to Unilever in 2014/15.
Chloraseptic throat medicine and lozenges sold to Prestige Brands.
Cinch all-purpose glass and surface cleaner, was sold to Shansby Group, a San Francisco investment firm, later acquired by Prestige Brands.
Clairol, formerly a personal products division of Procter & Gamble making hair coloring, hair spray, shampoo, hair conditioner, and styling products.  It was sold to Coty, Inc., on October 1, 2016
Balsam coloring brand (part of Clairol)
Natural Instincts hair coloring (part of Clairol)
Perfect Lights hair coloring (part of Clairol)
Coast bar-soap brand sold to Dial Corporation in 2000. Dial now owned by Henkel, Coast brand now owned by High Ridge Brands.
Comet long-time P&G brand of cleanser owned now by Prestige Brands
Crisco (vegetable oil and shortening) sold to The J.M. Smucker Company then sold to B&G Foods
Crush/Hires/Sun Drop carbonated soft drinks (sold to Cadbury Schweppes in late 1980s)
Dantrium sold to JHP Pharmaceuticals and SpePharm
Dash taken over by Dalli-Werke (dalli group)
Dari Creme and Star margarine (Philippines), sold to Philippine Dairy Products Corporation (now Magnolia Inc.) in 1995
Duncan Hines packaged cake mixes, sold to Aurora Foods (now Pinnacle Foods) in 1998
Duracell batteries sold to Berkshire Hathaway in 2016.
Escudo (Safeguard soap in Mexico), sold to Kimberly-Clark in 2016.
Fisher Nuts sold to John B. Sanfilippo and Son, Inc., in 1995
Fit fruit and vegetable cleaning wash licensed to HealthPro Brands in January 2004
Folgers coffee was acquired by The J.M. Smucker Company based in Orrville, Ohio, in June 2008.
 Gleem toothpaste (still being made by P&G, merged into the Crest brand as Crest Fresh and White
Hawaiian Punch now owned by Dr Pepper/7up
Iams cat and dog foods sold to Mars Corporation in 2014.
Infusium 23 (shampoos/conditioners) sold to Helen of Troy Limited's Idelle Labs unit in March 2009
Jif (peanut butter) divested by Procter & Gamble in a spin-off to their stockholders, followed by an immediate merger with The J.M. Smucker Company in 2002
Joy operations in the United States was sold to JoySuds LLC in September 2019.
Lava sold to WD-40 in 1999
Lilt Home Permanents, including "Push Button" Lilt, The First "Foam-In" Home Permanent In A Can. Sold To Schwartzkopf/DEP in 1987, later discontinued
Max Factor (sold to Coty)
Mayon cooking oil
Millstone coffee was acquired by The J.M. Smucker Company as part of its Folger's coffee acquisition in Orrville, Ohio in June 2008, Discontinued since 2016.
Noxzema skin cream and beauty products line sold to Alberto-Culver in 2008 (now owned by Unilever)
Oxydol sold to Redox Brands in 2000; Oxydol was P&G's first popular laundry soap, then later became a laundry detergent after Tide was introduced in 1946.
Perla laundry bar soap (Philippines) sold to SCPG Asia-Pacific
Pert Plus was sold to Innovative Brands, LLC in July 2006.
PG Tips tea; now owned by Unilever.
Prell shampoo sold to Prestige Brands International in 1999
Primex shortening (sold to ACH in 2001)
Pringles potato chips sold to Kellogg Company in June 2012
Pur (brand) brand of water filtration products. The brand was acquired from Recovery Engineering, Inc. in 1999 for approximately US$213 million. P&G sold Pur to Helen of Troy in January 2012 for an undisclosed amount.
Royale (Canada) brand of toilet paper. The original product was merged into the Charmin brand; Irving Tissue then acquired the trademark and re-introduced the brand on its own products.
Salvo brand of detergent tablets which was sold from around 1958 up to circa February 8, 1974-1978
Spic and Span now owned by The Spic and Span Company, a division of Prestige Brands
Sunny Delight orange drink spun off in 2004.
Sunshine margarine
Sure anti-perspirant/deodorant line was sold in October 2006 to brand-development firm Innovative Brands
Swisse  the distribution rights of popular vitamin line were sold back to Swisse Wellness in 2017
ThermaCare brand heat wraps sold to medical company Wyeth in 2008
Thrill a peach-scented brand of dishwashing liquid, discontinued after 1973.
Top Job all-purpose cleaner merged into the Mr. Clean brand in 1990
Victor shortening
Wash & Go haircare sold to Conter S.r.l. effective June 30, 2015
Wella, Clairol, CoverGirl Makeup sold to Coty Inc (2016)
Whirl butter flavored oil (sold to ACH in 2001)
Wondra brand of hand lotion sold from 1976 to 1989.
Zest deodorant body bar and body washes sold to High Ridge Brands Co. on January 4, 2011

Discontinued brands
Brands owned by Procter & Gamble in the past, but since phased out:
Banner, Summit, and White Cloud toilet tissues were merged with the company's best known bathroom tissue, Charmin. White Cloud was sold exclusively in Walmart stores in the U.S. before Kruger Products took over the brand and, with Walmart focusing on other brands, sold it in other stores
Big Top, brand of peanut butter before Jif made its debut.
Blossom, facial soap
Bonus, brand of laundry detergent that had children's books or towels in every box; sold from 1940s to 1977.
Citrus Hill, orange juice drink sold from 1983 to 1992
Drene (a.k.a. Special Drene, Royal Drene), liquid shampoo. First shampoo made from synthetic detergent.
Duz, powdered laundry soap and later, a powdered laundry detergent which had glassware and plates in each box; sold from 1920s to 1980.
Encaprin, coated aspirin
Fling, disposable dishcloth brand.
Fluffo, golden yellow shortening sold mid-1950s to early 1960s.
Fresco bath soap
Gleem, toothpaste last made in 2014. Procter and Gamble plans to sell the Gleem formulation under the brand name Crest Fresh and White.
Hidden Magic, hair spray.
High Point instant decaffeinated coffee, which had Lauren Bacall in its commercials; produced from 1974 to 1986.
Monchel, beauty soap
Nutri Delight, an instant orange juice drink, sold in the Philippines from 1999 to 2000. 
OK, economy bar and packaged laundry soap.
Rely, super-absorbent tampons in production from 1976 to 1980. It was pulled off the market during the TSS crisis of the early 1980s.
Salvo, first concentrated tablet laundry detergent, which was discontinued c. February 8, 1974; later a dish detergent (sold in the U.S. 2004-2005; it is still sold in Latin America)
Shasta, cream shampoo sold late 1940s-mid-1950s.
Solo, liquid laundry detergent with fabric softener that was later merged into the Bold brand, and sold from 1979 to 1990.
Star Soap and Star Naphtha Soap Chips
Stardust, dry chlorine bleach (extensively test-marketed during the 1960s)
Sunshine Margarine
 Swash, a range of laundry products and later a laundry appliance
Teel, liquid dentifrice sold late 1930s to late 1940s.
Tempo, brand of dry wipes, produced from 2000 to 2010.
Tender Leaf, tea brand sold from 1940s to 1975.
Thrill, dishwashing liquid last made in 1973
Torengos, stackable, triangular-shaped, corn-based snack chip sold from 2001 to 2003
Wondra lotion for dry skin. There were many formulas. (The first major brand to use "silicones") Sold from 1976 to 1989.
Vidal Sassoon Shampoos (sold from Philippines in 1990s)

References

Procter and Gamble
 
Procter